Poshtova Ploshcha is a station on Kyiv Metro's Obolonsko–Teremkivska Line. The station was opened on 17 December 1976, and is named after Kyiv's Poshtova Square (Post Square) near the Dnieper's embankment in the historic Podil neighbourhood. It was designed by A.S. Krushynskyi, T.A. Tselykovska, I.L. Maslenkov, and V.S. Bohdanovskyi.

The station is located shallow underground and consists of a central hall with columns. At the end of the station's hall, there is a stained glass decorative window. The station is accessible by passenger tunnels leading from the Volodymyrskyi Decent and the Poshtova Square. Near the station, the Kyiv Funicular is located, providing a main access to the station from the central part of Kyiv.

External links

 Kyivsky Metropoliten — Station description and photographs 
 Metropoliten.kiev.ua — Station description and photographs 

Kyiv Metro stations
Railway stations opened in 1976
1976 establishments in Ukraine